Yolaltı (literally "below the road" in Turkish) may refer to the following places in Turkey:

 Yolaltı, Bayburt, a village in the district of Bayburt, Bayburt Province
 Yolaltı, Kahta, a village in the district of Kahta, Adıyaman Province
 Yolaltı, Karacasu,  a village in the district of Karacasu, Aydın Province